Isaac or Sahak of Armenia (354–439) was Catholicos (or Patriarch) of the Armenian Apostolic Church. He is sometimes known as "Isaac the Great," and as "Sahak the Parthian" (Armenian: Սահակ Պարթեւ, Sahak Parthew", Parthian: Sahak-i Parthaw) owing to his Parthian origin.

Family 
Isaac was son of the Christian St. Nerses I and a Mamikonian princess called Sanducht. Through his father he was a Gregorid and was descended from the family of St. Gregory I the Enlightener. He was the fifth Catholicos of the Arsacid dynasty of Armenia after St. Gregory I the Enlightener (301–325), St. Aristaces I (325–333), St. Vrtanes I (333–341) and St. Husik I (341–347). His paternal grandmother was the Arsacid Princess Bambish, the sister of King Tigranes VII (Tiran) and a daughter of King Khosrov III.

Life 

Left an orphan at a very early age, Isaac received an excellent literary education in Constantinople, particularly in the Eastern languages. There he married an unnamed woman by whom he had a daughter called Sahakanoush who later married Hamazasp Mamikonian, a wealthy and influential Armenian nobleman. After the death of hs wife, he took up a life of seclusion and prayer.

After his election as patriarch in 386, he devoted himself to the religious and scientific training of his people. In 395, while re-building Saint Hripsime Church which had been destroyed by Shapur II, he found an urn containing her relics.

Armenia was then passing through a grave crisis. In 387 it had lost its independence and been divided between the Byzantine Empire and Persia; each division had at its head an Armenian but feudatory king. In the Byzantine territory, however, the Armenians were forbidden the use of the Syriac language, until then exclusively used in divine worship: for this the Greek language was to be substituted, and the country gradually Hellenized; in the Persian districts, on the contrary, Greek was absolutely prohibited, while Syriac was greatly favoured. In this way the ancient culture of the Armenians was in danger of disappearing and national unity was seriously compromised.

To save both Isaac encouraged Mesrop to invent the Armenian alphabet and began to translate the Christian Bible; 
their translation from the Syriac Peshitta was revised by means of the Septuagint, and even, it seems, from the Hebrew text (between 410 and 430). The liturgy also, hitherto Syrian was translated into Armenian, drawing at the same time on the liturgy of Saint Basil of Caesarea, so as to obtain for the new service a national color. Isaac had already established schools for higher education with the aid of disciples whom he had sent to study at Edessa, Melitene, Constantinople, and elsewhere. Through them he now had the principal masterpieces of Greek and Syrian Christian literature translated, e.g. the writings of Athanasius of Alexandria, Cyril of Jerusalem, Basil, the two Gregorys (Gregory of Nazianzus and Gregory of Nyssa), John Chrysostom, Ephrem the Syrian, etc. Armenian literature in its golden age was, therefore, mainly a borrowed literature.

Through Isaac's efforts the churches and monasteries destroyed by the Persians were rebuilt, education was cared for in a generous way, Zoroastrianism which Shah Yazdegerd I tried to set up was cast out, and three councils held to re-establish ecclesiastical discipline. Isaac is said to have been the author of liturgical hymns.

Two letters, written by Isaac to Theodosius II and to Archbishop Atticus of Constantinople, have been preserved. A third letter addressed to Saint Proclus of Constantinople was not written by him, but dates from the tenth century. Neither did he have any share, as was wrongly ascribed to him, in the First Council of Ephesus of 431, though, in consequence of disputes which arose in Armenia between the followers of Nestorius and the disciples of Acathius of Melitene and Rabbula, Isaac and his church did appeal to Constantinople and through Saint Proclus obtained the desired explanations.

A man of enlightened piety and of very austere life, Isaac owed his deposition by the king in 426 to his great independence of character. In 430, he was allowed to resume his patriarchal throne. In his extreme old age he seems to have withdrawn into solitude, dying at the age of 85
, probably on September 7, 439. 

Hovhannes Draskhanakerttsi says his body was taken to Taron and buried in the village of Ashtishat. Several days are consecrated to his memory in the Armenian Apostolic Church.

References

Sources
  Les dynasties de la Caucasie chrétienne de l’Antiquité jusqu’au XIXe siècle ; Tables généalogiques et chronologiques, Rome, 1990.
  Histoire de l'Arménie: des origines à 1071, Paris, 1947.

Armenian saints
Catholicoi of Armenia
Armenian centenarians
4th-century Armenian bishops
5th-century Armenian bishops
338 births
439 deaths
Doctors of the Church
5th-century Christian saints
5th-century Iranian people
4th-century Iranian people
4th-century translators
5th-century writers
Christians in the Sasanian Empire
Men centenarians